Colegio Monteverde is a private school in Santa Fe, and in Cuajimalpa, Mexico City.

The school serves levels preschool through high school (preparatoria). The campus has an area of 10,000 m2.

History
The school officially opened on September 2, 1985. At the time of founding the school served pre-primary and six primary grades, and it opened with 43 students. The number increased to 63 students in the 1986–1987 school year, when the first two grades of middle school (secundaria) began. By the 1987–1988 school year the school extended to bachillerato No. 6, and the student body was at 123. The school moved to its current Santa Fe campus in July 1996, and the preschool opened in the 1996–1997 school year.

References

External links
 Colegio Monteverde 

High schools in Mexico City
1985 establishments in Mexico
Educational institutions established in 1985